The Grammy Award for Best Inspirational Performance was awarded from 1962 to 1986. During this time the award had several name changes:

Best Gospel or Other Religious Recording (1962, 1963)
Best Gospel or Other Religious Recording (Musical) (1964–66)
Best Sacred Performance (Musical) (1967)
Best Sacred Performance (1968, 1969)
Best Sacred Performance (Non-Classical) (1970)
Best Sacred Performance (Musical) (1971)
Best Sacred Performance (1972)
Best Inspirational Performance (1973, 1974)
Best Inspirational Performance (Non-Classical) (1975)
Best Inspirational Performance (1976–86)

Years reflect the year in which the Grammy Awards were presented, for works released in the previous year.

Recipients

References

Grammy Awards for gospel music
Inspirational Performance